The Canon del Colorado Formation is an Early Jurassic geologic formation in the San Juan Province of Argentina. The formation comprises conglomerates and claystones and is exposed in the Sierra de Mogna. Dinosaur remains are among the fossils that have been recovered from the formation; Adeopapposaurus.

See also 
 List of dinosaur-bearing rock formations
 List of stratigraphic units with indeterminate dinosaur fossils
 Etjo Sandstone

References

Bibliography 
 Weishampel, David B.; Dodson, Peter; and Osmólska, Halszka (eds.): The Dinosauria, 2nd, Berkeley: University of California Press. 861 pp. .

Further reading 
 R. N. Martínez. 2009. Adeopapposaurus mognai, gen. et sp. nov. (Dinosauria: Sauropodomorpha), with comments on adaptations of basal Sauropodomorpha. Journal of Vertebrate Paleontology 29(1):142-164
 J. P. Milana, R. N. Martínez, and O. A. Alcober. 1995. A new dinosaur locality of Upper Triassic-Lower Jurassic age from San Juan province, Argentina. Journal of Vertebrate Paleontology 15(3, suppl.):44A-45A

Geologic formations of Argentina
Jurassic System of South America
Early Jurassic South America
Jurassic Argentina
Conglomerate formations
Shale formations
Fossiliferous stratigraphic units of South America
Paleontology in Argentina
Geology of San Juan Province, Argentina